The Methylocystaceae are a family of bacteria that are capable of obtaining carbon and energy from methane. Such bacteria are called methanotrophs, and in particular the Methylocystaceae comprise the type II methanotrophs, which are structurally and biochemically distinct from the Methylococcaceae or type I methanotrophs.

In this family methane is oxidized to form formaldehyde, which is assimilated by the serine pathway. This involves combining formaldehyde and glycine to form serine, which may be converted into glyceraldehyde and thus into other organic molecules. They can also fix nitrogen, like many other members of the order Hyphomicrobiales. The cells contained paired internal membranes which are arranged towards their periphery.

References

 
Hyphomicrobiales